Ori Calif is an Israeli property developer and lawyer who owns the English pubs The Magdala and the Carlton Tavern. In 2015, Calif had The Carlton Tavern demolished days before it was due to be listed by English Heritage. He was later forced to rebuild the pub.

Calif's multiple attempts to turn part of The Magdala into private residences have rejected by London planning authorities. He closed in the pub in 2014, after its 160 years of continuous trading, and reopened it in 2021.

Property development 

Calif was the sole director of CLTX Limited when the company purchased and subsequently demolished the Carlton Tavern without getting the necessary permission from Westminster City Council. The tavern was the only building in the street to survive the Blitz during World War II. The council forced CLTX to rebuild the pub "brick by brick". Calif was criticised by government lawyer Stephen Wilcox who said "The appellant knew planning permission to demolish had been refused and that listing of the premises was a possibility but decided to take matters into his own hands to avoid the financial implications of the premises being listed." In January 2021, CLTX changed its name to Carlton Vale Ltd. The pub reopened on April 12, 2021, following the lifting of COVID-19 public health restrictions in England. Calif leased the pub back to the pre-demolition tenants.

Calif is the owner of The Magdala Tavern on South Hill Park in Hampstead and has repeatedly had planning proposals to turn parts of the pub into housing rejected. After trading for 160 years, Calif closed the pub in September 2014, and put it on the market for sale. The pub reopened in 2021.

Legal career 
As a lawyer, Calif works for GWO & Co. and has worked as an advisor to Cattle Market Limited, the landlords of the St Peter's House block of 53 flats in Norwich, and to Panama-based corporation Jiltis Corp..

See also 

 Listed buildings in England
 List of demolished buildings and structures in London

References 
Israeli emigrants to the United Kingdom

Israeli businesspeople
Real estate and property developers
Living people
Year of birth missing (living people)
Businesspeople from London
Publicans